Afikpo is the second most urbanized area in Ebonyi, Nigeria, after the state capital Abakaliki. It is made up of Afikpo North and Afikpo South. Afikpo South is historically referred to as Edda.

The current member of the House of Representatives (9th assembly) representing Afikpo North / Afikpo South federal constituency is Iduma Igariwey Enwo.

Below is a list of people from Afikpo:
Sinach
Akanu Ibiam
Uche Azikiwe
Iduma Igariwey Enwo
Samuel Eto'o
Priscilla Ekwere Eleje
Chris Abani
Michael Nnachi Okoro
Michael Ama Nnachi
Francis Otunta
Nnenna Oti

References 

Lists of Nigerian people
Ebonyi State